Tokai is a small town in Pendang District, Kedah, Malaysia.

Pendang District
Towns in Kedah